Edelmiro Julián Farrell Plaul (12 February 1887 – 21 October 1980) was an Argentine general. He was the de facto president of Argentina between 1944 and 1946.

Farrell had a great influence on later Argentine history by introducing his subordinate Juan Perón into government and paving the way for Perón's subsequent political career.

Early life
He was born in 1887 in Villa de los Industriales (Lanús, Buenos Aires). He was the tenth son of Juan C. Farrell (1846–1887) and Catalina Plaul (1852–1917) and the grandson of Matthew Farrell (1803–1860) of County Longford where the family seat of the Farrell clan heralds from in  Ireland as Lords of Annaly, and Mónica Ibáñez (1819–1867).

Military career
Farrell graduated from Argentine military school in 1907 as an infantry sub-lieutenant. He served in an Italian alpine regiment in Fascist Italy between 1924 and 1926. He then returned to Argentina. 

After the 1943 coup, Farrell was promoted to brigadier general and became vice-president during the military government of General Pedro Pablo Ramírez, who had deposed President Arturo Rawson. He was simultaneously Minister of War. Farrell appointed Juan Perón as his secretary.

President
Ramírez named Farrell as president on 25 February 1944. Farrell appointed Perón as vice-president. After popular demonstrations in favour of Perón in 1945 made Perón the most influential and important man in the government, Farrell announced presidential elections for 1946, and Perón was elected. On 4 June 1946, Farrell was succeeded as president by Perón. Farrell had been his commander while Perón was a colonel.

Farrell declared war on Nazi Germany and the Empire of Japan on 27 March 1945 towards the end of World War II after pressure to get Argentina as part of the Allies after the Inter-American Conference on Problems of War and Peace.

Family
He married on 10 July 1921, to Conrada Victoria Torni (1 January 1895 – 16 August 1977), a teacher. They had three children: Nelly Victoria (born 1923), Jorge Edelmiro (1925–1950), and Susana Mabel (born 1930).

Death
A widower, he died in 1980.

In popular culture
Farrell, in the movie Evita, is portrayed by British actor Denis Lill.

References

Sources

External links

Short Biography (Spanish)

Presidents of Argentina
1887 births
1980 deaths
Leaders who took power by coup
World War II political leaders
Argentine generals
Argentine people of Irish descent
People from Avellaneda
People from Buenos Aires
Vice presidents of Argentina
Burials at La Chacarita Cemetery
20th-century Argentine politicians